State Route 265 (SR 265) is a  state highway in Esmeralda County, Nevada, United States.  Referred to as Silver Peak Road, it connects the community of Silver Peak to U.S. Route 6 and U.S. Route 95 (US 6–95).  The route formerly existed as State Route 47.

Route description

SR 265 starts at Silver Peak Road (an unrelated road heading east) just southwest of Silver Peak. The highway curves north as the main road through the town. Outside of Silver Peak, the route heads north and slightly westward through the desert.

History
Silver Peak Road first appears on the 1935 edition of the official state highway map.  This version shows it as State Route 47, an unimproved highway.  The entire road had been paved by 1940.  SR 47 remained relatively unchanged until ca. 1978, when the highway was rechristened as State Route 265.

Major intersections

See also

References

265
Transportation in Esmeralda County, Nevada